The "6mm Optimum" is a concept popularized in 1999 by military writer Stanley C. Crist.

History
Crist argued for the adoption of a 6mm service rifle chambering as a replacement for the venerable 5.56×45mm NATO and 7.62×51mm NATO, calculating that such a loading would be near the weight and minimal recoil of the lightweight 5.56 (.223 caliber) while nearer the terminal performance of the heavier 7.62, thereby permitting a single cartridge to serve in general-purpose machine guns, sniper rifles, and infantry carbines.

Ballistics
Crist's specifications were that "6mm Optimum" ammunition achieve, with a  bullet:
Muzzle velocity: 
Velocity at 1200 m:  (slightly over the speed of sound)
Muzzle energy: 
Energy at 1200 m: 
Flight-time to 1200 m: 2.21 seconds
Deflection at 1200 m:  in  wind speed
Maximum trajectory height: 

...of which he noted, "...even with a conservative estimate for the muzzle velocity of the 6mm Optimum cartridge, computed data for 1200-meter velocity, flight-time, wind-deflection, and trajectory height are all greatly superior to both 5.56 and 7.62 NATO rounds."

See also
Ballistic table
5.8×21mm (6mm bullet diameter)
5.8×42mm (6mm bullet diameter) 
6mm PPC
6mm AR
6mm ARC
.243 Winchester Super Short Magnum
6 mm XC
6×45mm SAW
6-6.5x47 Lapua
6mm Lee Navy
6 mm caliber
List of rifle cartridges
Table of handgun and rifle cartridges

References

Pistol and rifle cartridges